Seth Brady Tucker (born 1969) or "S. Brady Tucker", is an American poet and fiction writer and veteran and is known for his creative and scholarly contributions to contemporary War Literature, in particular, the first Persian Gulf War. His second book of poems, We Deserve the Gods We Ask For, was published by Gival Press in 2015. His first book of poetry, Mormon Boy, was published by Elixir Press in 2012. His books and his fiction and poetry have won Bevel Summers Fiction Prize from Shenandoah, the Flash Fiction Award from Literal Latte, and was a finalist for the Jeff Sharlet Award from the Iowa Review, the Lamar York Nonfiction Prize, the James Hearst Poetry Prize, and was a Special Mention in the Pushcart Prize Anthology.

Life
Seth Brady Tucker was born in 1969 in Lander, Wyoming, a small ranching town east of the Wind River Range. He was raised in a hard-working but poor Mormon family and worked the ranch and as a pipe-cutter and as a paperboy to make ends meet. Tucker was a standout high school basketball player but joined the US Army immediately after graduation and after a year of training reported to Fort Bragg, North Carolina, and the Quick Reaction Force and the 82nd Airborne Division. Tucker served in the Persian Gulf War, and wrote about his experiences in his first book, "Mormon Boy," published by Elixir Press in 2012. Tucker was honorably discharged in 1992 and drove across the country to California to attend school at San Francisco State University as an Electrical Engineer major. Tucker was actively writing and was known as a voracious reader, so soon switched majors to English Literature with a focus in Creative Writing. While at SFSU, Tucker played for the collegiate men's basketball team there, working nights as a Sommelier. Tucker went on to earn degrees from San Francisco State University, Northern Arizona University, and from the top-ranked Creative Writing program at Florida State University (PhD English 2012).

Career
Tucker founded and co-directs the Longleaf Writers’ Conference (which takes place annually in May in Florida).  Tucker teaches in veteran and caretaker programs and inmates through prison literacy programs and as a first-generation college student himself, actively works with students at the Colorado School of Mines. Tucker is a Senior Prose editor at the Tupelo Quarterly Review, and has previously been on the editing board for the Southeast Review and for Thin Air Magazine. Tucker teaches multi-genre, mixed-genre, and poetry, fiction, and creative nonfiction classes at the Lighthouse Writers’ Workshop in Denver, Colorado, where he lives and writes.

Published works
· Mormon Boy, Elixir Press, 2012.
· We Deserve the Gods We Ask For, Gival Press, 2015.
· Amazon Author Page

References
· Sundress Interview
· Poets and Writers Bio
· Interview 
· storySouth Interview
· Review
· Review
· Interview

External links
  Author Website
 Longleaf Writers Conference page
 Lighthouse Writers Workshop page
 Listing at Poets and Writers
 Listing at the Associated Writers and Writing Conferences website
 Faculty page at CSM
 Eric Hoffer Award
 Gival Press Poetry Award
 Elixir Press Poetry Award

Living people
American male poets
American fiction writers
Writers from Wyoming
People from Lander, Wyoming
San Francisco State University alumni
Northern Arizona University alumni
Florida State University alumni
Colorado School of Mines faculty
21st-century American poets
21st-century American male writers
1969 births